Ryszard Antoni Marczak (born 25 November 1945 in Gdynia, Pomorskie) is a former long-distance runner from Poland, who represented his native country at the 1980 Summer Olympics in Moscow, USSR. He set his personal best (2:11:35) in the classic distance in 1981.

Achievements

References

External links
 sports-reference

1945 births
Living people
Polish male long-distance runners
Athletes (track and field) at the 1980 Summer Olympics
Olympic athletes of Poland
Sportspeople from Gdynia
Zawisza Bydgoszcz athletes
Polish male marathon runners